Murder as a Fine Art is a 1953 detective novel by Carol Carnac, the pen name of the British writer Edith Caroline Rivett. It is the ninth of fourteen novels featuring the character of Inspector Julian Rivers of Scotland Yard.

Synopsis
The newly formed Ministry of Fine Arts is seemingly a curse institution. The first minister dies just after taking office and a second not long afterwards. A third death occurs when a huge bust topples down and crushes Edwin Pompfret the permanent secretary of the department.

References

Bibliography
 Cooper, John & Pike, B.A. Artists in Crime: An Illustrated Survey of Crime Fiction First Edition Dustwrappers, 1920-1970. Scolar Press, 1995.
 Hubin, Allen J. Crime Fiction, 1749-1980: A Comprehensive Bibliography. Garland Publishing, 1984.
 Nichols, Victoria & Thompson, Susan. Silk Stalkings: More Women Write of Murder. Scarecrow Press, 1998.
 Reilly, John M. Twentieth Century Crime & Mystery Writers. Springer, 2015.

1953 British novels
British mystery novels
Novels by E.C.R. Lorac
Novels set in London
British detective novels
William Collins, Sons books